"Dreaming" is a song by American new wave band Blondie. Released in 1979, the song was the opening track from their fourth album Eat to the Beat. Written by guitarist Chris Stein and singer Debbie Harry and partially inspired by ABBA's "Dancing Queen," the song also features an active drum performance by drummer Clem Burke, who did not expect the final recording to feature his busy drum track.

"Dreaming" was released as the lead single from Eat to the Beat in September 1979, reaching number two on the UK singles chart and number 27 on the US Billboard Hot 100. The band saw this as a disappointing performance, though the song remained one of the band's highest charting singles to that point. The song's single release was also accompanied by a music video.

The song has since become one of Blondie's most famous tracks, appearing on several compilation albums and becoming a mainstay of the band's live setlist. It has since seen critical acclaim and several music writers have named the song as one of the band's best.

Background 
The lyrics for "Dreaming" originated from the line "dreaming is free", which band member Chris Stein thought of. After hearing the music for the song that Stein wrote, Debbie Harry wrote the rest of the lyrics. Harry explained the process of writing the lyrics in an interview with Entertainment Weekly, saying "Sometimes Chris will come up with a track or a feel and pass it on to me, and he'll say, 'I was thinking 'Dreaming/Dreaming is free',' and then I'll fill it out with a story line or some more phrases. A lot of times it's the rhythm track that suggests what the lyric is going to be. I like working like that."

Musically, "Dreaming" is a fast-paced new wave song. Stein has since claimed that "Dreaming" is "pretty much a cop" of "Dancing Queen" by ABBA; he continued, "I don't know if that was where we started, or if it ended just happening to sound like that." Michael Gallucci of Ultimate Classic Rock said the song "tak[es] a cue from Phil Spector's Wall of Sound."  Billboard Magazine described "Dreaming" as a "driving rocker that moves with rollercoaster intensity" and described Harry's lead vocals as "mesmerizing."

According to the band's keyboardist Jimmy Destri, the song, like many from the Eat to the Beat album, was recorded live in the studio. The song also features a frantic drum performance written by drummer Clem Burke. Burke said of his drumming on the song:

Release 
The song was released on September 14, 1979 as the first single from Eat to the Beat. While the US release of the single had "Living in the Real World" as the B-side, the British version used "Sound-A-Sleep" instead. Both of those songs likewise feature on Eat to the Beat. A music video was produced to promote the single featuring Debbie Harry wearing a solid blue unitard and matching sheer blouse designed by Stephen Sprouse.

"Dreaming" was most successful as a single in the UK, peaking at number two on the singles chart. Burke later expressed disappointment at the song's inability to reach number one in Britain unlike other Blondie singles, saying, "English audiences are notoriously fickle. They go off on people after a while. It's been done before. We're so spoiled by having all those number ones."

The single was also successful in Ireland as well as in Canada, reaching number three and number four respectively. In the US, it peaked at number 27 on the Billboard Hot 100, becoming Blondie's third Top 40 hit there (after "Heart of Glass" (number one) and "One Way or Another" (number 24) earlier in the year). Clem Burke attributed the song's relatively lower chart position to his drumming, saying "I always say 'Dreaming' would have been a bigger hit had I not played like that. It was Top 40, but it was never a huge hit."

"Dreaming" has since been featured on multiple compilation albums, such as The Best of Blondie, The Complete Picture: The Very Best of Deborah Harry and Blondie, Atomic: The Very Best of Blondie, and Greatest Hits Deluxe Redux. Blondie re-recorded the song for the 2014 compilation album Greatest Hits Deluxe Redux.

In 2019 "Dreaming" was used as the opening credits theme song for the third and final season of the HBO drama The Deuce.

Reception 
Since its release, "Dreaming" has seen critical acclaim from music writers. Stewart Mason of AllMusic praised Stein's guitarwork and Burke's drumming on the song, writing of the latter, "It's an amazing performance, possibly the most over-the-top effort by a rock & roll drummer in the entire 1970s, and a must to hear." Debra Rae Cohen of Rolling Stone wrote that Dreaming' makes the keynote statement [of Eat to the Beat]." Christian John Wikane of PopMatters praised Harry's vocals on the song, writing, "She sings with a vocal power unknown to audiences, at the time, who were only familiar with the synthetic thrills on 'Heart of Glass. Jim Beviglia of American Songwriter praised the song's "poignancy" and stated, "Blondie's songs tend to be so much fun that's it's easy to overlook their depth and the craft behind them. Don't make that mistake with 'Dreaming,' or you might miss the hurting yet ultimately hopeful heart beating inside that pristine pop shell."  Cash Box said it has "a pounding, chugging rhythm and Harry's distinctive 'girl-group' vocals" and more "pop power" than the Knack.  Billboard called it a "a driving rocker that moves at rollercoaster intensity" and praised Debbie Harry's lead vocals as "clear and mesmerizing."

Several critics have ranked "Dreaming" as one of Blondie's best songs. Billboard writers named "Dreaming" as the fourth best Blondie song, writing, "The feel-good, uplifting vibes of this power pop ballad still hold their influence today." Ultimate Classic Rock named it the band's fifth best song, stating, Dreaming' wraps everything Blondie did so well—girl-group bounce, big pop hook, the meshing of styles and eras—in the thickest battalion of drums and backing vocals they ever recorded." Far Out Magazine ranked the song as the band's sixth best, calling it "undeniably one of the band’s most underrated songs" and writing, "Harry and co. delivered a song which is a distillation of everything that made them great." uDiscoverMusic named the song as one of the top 20 Blondie songs. In 2021, it was listed at No. 414 on Rolling Stone's "Top 500 Best Songs of All Time" in 2021.

Live performances 
"Dreaming" has become a staple of Blondie's live performances, being performed for a time as the second track in the band's setlist. Blondie notably performed the song live on Saturday Night Live in 1979, a performance that ended with Burke jumping over his drumset toward the camera. Burke later described the video of the performance as "awesome".

Lead singer Debbie Harry performed a version of the song with the Dum Dum Girls at South by Southwest in 2014. Josh Terry of Consequence of Sound described the rendition as "woozy" and "upbeat".

Cover versions 
The Smashing Pumpkins released a cover of "Dreaming" on their 1996 single "Bullet With Butterfly Wings." The song was also covered by Yo La Tengo for the new wave tribute album Freedom of Choice: Yesterday's New Wave Hits as Performed by Today's Stars.

American rock band Green Day released a cover of "Dreaming" on May 22, 2020. The music video features the band reminiscing of days gone by, featuring footage from previous tours of the band on the road and performing live.

Charts

Weekly charts

Year-end charts

Certifications

Release history 
UK 7"  (CHS 2359, September 1979)
"Dreaming" (Deborah Harry, Chris Stein) — 3:08
"Sound-A-Sleep" (Harry, Stein) — 4:18

US 7"  (CHS 2379, September 1979)
"Dreaming" (Deborah Harry, Chris Stein) — 3:08
"Living in the Real World" (Jimmy Destri) — 2:53

US 12" Promo  (CHS14-PDJ, September 1979)
"Dreaming" (Deborah Harry, Chris Stein) — 3:08
"Dreaming" (Deborah Harry, Chris Stein) — 3:08

References 

1979 songs
1979 singles
Blondie (band) songs
Chrysalis Records singles
American power pop songs
Song recordings produced by Mike Chapman
Songs written by Chris Stein
Songs written by Debbie Harry